Tala Birell (born Natalie Bierle; 10 September 1907 – 17 February 1958) was a Romanian-born stage and film actress.

Early years
Birell was born Natalie Bierle on 10 September 1907, the daughter of Bavarian businessman Karl Bierle and Stefanie von Schaydakowska, who came from Austro-Hungarian Galicia.

Career

Birell had stage and screen experience in Vienna. She doubled for Marlene Dietrich in German films.

The Oakland Tribune reported that Birell "made her debut in a hit in a Berlin production of Madame Pompadour." She came to England in 1930 to appear in E. A. Dupont's Menschen im Käfig, the German language version of Cape Forlorn, and later went to America to play in the German version of The Boudoir Diplomat. Star of stage in Europe, she became popular in American films, including a small role in Bringing Up Baby (1938).

In 1940 she appeared onstage in My Dear Children at the Belasco Theatre in New York City. She also appeared on Broadway in Order Please (1934). One of her final on-camera appearances was on the popular 1953 US anthology drama television series Orient Express in the episode titled The Red Sash.

She is buried in the Bavarian village Marquartstein in a family tomb.

Filmography

Man spielt nicht mit der Liebe (1926) .... Bit Role (as Thala Birell)
Ich habe im Mai von der Liebe geträumt (1927)
 The Deed of Andreas Harmer (1930) .... Othmars Valentin's Gattin
Menschen im Käfig (1930) .... Eileen Kell
Liebe auf Befehl (1931) .... Marie-Anne
My Cousin from Warsaw (1931) .... Lucienne
Doomed Battalion (1932) .... Maria Di Mai
Nagana (1933) .... Countess Sandra Lubeska
Let's Fall in Love (1933) .... Rose Forsell
The Captain Hates the Sea (1934) .... Gerta Klargi
Let's Live Tonight (1935) .... Countess Margot de Legere
Air Hawks (1935) .... Renee Dupont
Spring Tonic (1935) .... Lola
Crime and Punishment (1935) .... Antonya Raskolnikov
The Lone Wolf Returns (1935) .... Liane Mallison
White Legion (1936) .... Dr. Sterne
She's Dangerous (1937) .... Stephanie Duval
As Good as Married (1937) .... Princess Cherry Bouladoff
Bringing Up Baby (1938) .... Mrs. Lehman
Invisible Enemy (1938) .... Sandra Kamarov
Josette (1938) .... Mlle. Josette
Seven Miles from Alcatraz (1942) .... Baroness
One Dangerous Night (1943) .... Sonia Budenny
China (1943) .... Blonde
Isle of Forgotten Sins (1943) .... Christine
Women in Bondage (1943) .... Ruth Bracken
The Song of Bernadette (1943) .... Madame Leontine Bruat (uncredited)
The Purple Heart (1944) .... Johanna Hartwig
The Monster Maker (1944) .... Maxine
Make Your Own Bed (1944) .... Miss Marie Gruber
Till We Meet Again (1944) .... Mme. Bouchard (uncredited)
Mrs. Parkington (1944) .... Lady Nora Ebbsworth
Jungle Queen (1945, Serial) .... Dr. Elise Bork
The Power of the Whistler (1945) .... Constantina Ivaneska
The Frozen Ghost (1945) .... Valerie Monet
Girls of the Big House (1945) .... Alma, confined murderess
Dangerous Millions (1946) .... Sonia Bardos
Philo Vance's Gamble (1947) .... Tina Cromwell
Philo Vance's Secret Mission (1947) .... Mrs. Elizabeth Phillips
Song of Love (1947) .... Princess Valerie Hohenfels
Women in the Night (1948) .... Yvette Aubert
Homicide for Three (1948) .... Rita Brown
Flash Gordon (1955, TV series) .... Queen of Cygini (final appearance)

Notes

References

External links

 
 
 
 Photographs and literature on Tala Birell

American film actresses
Romanian emigrants to the United States
Actresses from Vienna
1907 births
1958 deaths
20th-century American actresses